Bluesfest may refer to:

 Byron Bay Bluesfest, in Australia, also known as East Coast Blues & Roots Music Festival
 Bluesfest International Windsor, in Windsor, Ontario, Canada
 Ottawa Bluesfest, a blues and rock festival in Ottawa, Ontario, Canada